The Central District of Langarud County is a district (bakhsh) in Langarud County, Gilan Province, Iran. At the 2006 census, its population was 90,729, in 26,475 families.  The District has two cities: Langarud and Chaf and Chamkhaleh. The District has three rural districts (dehestan): Chaf Rural District, Divshal Rural District, and Gel-e Sefid Rural District.

References 

Langarud County
Districts of Gilan Province